Golden Eagle Awards for Best Directing for a Television Series (Chinese name:中国电视金鹰奖电视剧最佳导演) is a main category of the Golden Eagle Awards.

Winners and nominees

2020s

2010s

2000s

1990s

References

External links
Past Winners of Golden Eagles

Chinese television awards
Director